Samu Perhonen (born March 7, 1993) is a Finnish ice hockey goaltender. His is currently playing with Boxers de Bordeaux in the French Ligue Magnus. Perhonen was selected by the Edmonton Oilers in the 3rd round (62nd overall) of the 2011 NHL Entry Draft.

Perhonen made his Liiga debut playing with HIFK during the 2013–14 Liiga season.

References

External links
 

1993 births
Living people
Edmonton Oilers draft picks
Finnish ice hockey goaltenders
HIFK (ice hockey) players
KalPa players